The  is a Japanese science fiction award. It has been compared to the Nebula Award as it is given by the Science Fiction and Fantasy Writers of Japan or SFWJ. The Grand Prize is selected from not only Science Fiction novels, but also various SF movies, animations, and manga.

 are awarded to the works that is considered to be special by the juries.

Winners
1st (1980) Taiyōfū Kōten (Solar Wind Node) by Akira Hori
2nd (1981) Kirikiri-Jin by Hisashi Inoue
3rd (1982) Saigo no Teki (The Last Enemy) by Masaki Yamada
4th (1983) Dōmu by Katsuhiro Ōtomo
5th (1984) Genshi Gari (Fancy-Poem Hunting) by Chiaki Kawamata
6th (1985) Tokyo Blackout (Capital City Disappeared) by Sakyō Komatsu
7th (1986) Warai Uchū no Tabi Geinin (Jongleur in Laughing Cosmos) by Musashi Kanbe
8th (1987) Teito Monogatari (Empire Capital Saga) by Hiroshi Aramata
9th (1988)
 Misaki Ichiro no Teikō (Resistance of Misaki Ichiro) by Ryō Hanmura
 Kaidanji: Oshikawa Shunrō (Devil of a fellow: Oshikawa Shunrō) by Jun'ya Yokota and Shingo Aizu
10th (1989) Jōgen no Tsuki wo Taberu Shishi (The Lion Eats Increscent Moon) by Baku Yumemakura
Special Award for Osamu Tezuka
11th (1990) Ad Bird by 
12th (1991) Salamander Senmetsu (Salamander Omnicide) by Shinji Kajio
Special Award for Fujio Ishihara
13th (1992) Asa no Gaspard (Gaspard of the Morning) by Yasutaka Tsutsui
14th (1993) Venus City by Gorō Masaki
Special Award for 
15th (1994)
 Sensō wo Enjita Kamigamitachi (Gods Who Played War) by Mariko Ōhara
 Joseijō Muishiki by Mari Kotani
16th (1995) Kototsubo (Wordpot) by Chohei Kanbayashi
Special Award to 
17th (1996) Gamera 2: Attack of Legion directed by Shūsuke Kaneko
18th (1997)
 Gamōtei Jiken by Miyuki Miyabe
 Neon Genesis Evangelion by Hideaki Anno
19th (1998) Brain Valley by Hideaki Sena
 Special Awards to:
Shinichi Hoshi
NHK Ningen Daigaku "Uchū o Kūsō Shitekita Hitobito" by 
Igyō Collection, edited by 
20th (1999) Tigris to Euphrates by Motoko Arai
Special Award to Ryū Mitsuse
21st (2000) Nihon SF Ronsōshi by Takayuki Tatsumi
22nd (2001) Kamekun by 
23rd (2002)
 Arabia no Yoru no Shuzoku by 
 Kugutsukō by 
24th (2003) Marduk Scramble by Tō Ubukata
25th (2004) Innocence by Mamoru Oshii
Special Award to Tetsu Yano
26th (2005) Katadorareta Chikara by Hirotaka Tobi
27th (2006) Otherworld Barbara by Moto Hagio
28th (2007) Hoshi Shinichi 1001Wa o Tsukutta Hito by 
29th (2008)
 From the New World by Yusuke Kishi
 Den-noh Coil by Mitsuo Iso
Special Award to 
30th (2009) Harmony by Keikaku Itō
 Special Award to Guin Saga by Kaoru Kurimoto
31st (2010)
 Nihon SF Seishinshi by 
 Penguin Highway by Tomihiko Morimi
 Special Award to Takumi Shibano and 
32nd (2011)
 Karyū no Miya by Sayuri Ueda
 Special Award to Kindai Nihon Kisō Shōsetsushi: Meiji Hen by Jun'ya Yokota
 Special Services Award to Sakyo Komatsu
33rd (2012)
 Kiryū Keisatsu: Jibaku Jōkō by 
 Banjō no Yoru by 
 Special Award to Shisha no Teikoku by Keikaku Itō and Toh Enjoe
 34th (2013)
 Kaikin no To by Dempow Torishima
 Special Awards to:
 NOVA Original anthology series, edited by 
 Johannesburg no Tenshi Tachi by 
 35th (2014)
 Orbital Cloud by Taiyō Fujii
 My Humanity by 
 Contribution Award to Kazumasa Hirai
 36th (2015)
 Columbia Zero by Kōshū Tani
 Toppen by Hiroyuki Morioka
 Special Award to Gessekai Shōsetsu by 
 Contribution Award to Noriyoshi Ohrai
 37th (2016)
 Wombs by Yumiko Shirai
 Special Award to Shin Godzilla directed by Hideaki Anno (chief), Shinji Higuchi
 38th (2017)
 Game no Ōkoku by 
 Jisei no Yume by Hirotaka Tobi
 Contribution Award to 
 39th (2018)
 Tobu Kujaku by 
 Mojika by Toh EnJoe
 Contribution Award to Jun'ya Yokota
 40th (2019)
 Tenmei no Shirube by Issui Ogawa
 Yadokari no Hoshi by Dempow Torishima
 Contribution Award to Hideo Azuma and Taku Mayumura
 41st (2020)
 Kanki no uta Hakubutsukan wakusei III by Hiroe Suga
 Seikei Izumo no heitan series (nine volumes) by 
 Contribution Award to Yasumi Kobayashi
 42nd (2021)
 Ōoku: The Inner Chambers by Fumi Yoshinaga
 43rd (2022)
 SF-suru Shikō - Aramaki Yoshio SF Hyōron Shūsei by Yoshio Aramaki
 Zangetsuki by 

See also
Seiun Awards
Sense of Gender Awards

References
 
 日本ＳＦ大賞, Science Fiction and Fantasy Writers of Japan.

External links
 Awards , at SFWJ

 

Awards established in 1980
Japanese science fiction awards
Japanese-language literary awards
1980 establishments in Japan